Hatuwagadhi is a rural municipality out of 7 rural municipalities of Bhojpur District of Province No. 1 of Nepal. There are a total of 9 municipalities in Bhojpur in which 2 are urban and 7 are rural.

Hatuwagadhi was known as Majh Kirant before the unification of Nepal by Shah Kings. It was capital of Kirat Kingdom. The ruins of the ancient capital and forts still exist at Hatuwagadhi.

References

External links
 Official website

Rural municipalities in Koshi Province
Populated places in Bhojpur District, Nepal
Rural municipalities of Nepal established in 2017
Rural municipalities in Bhojpur District